Lee Jung-hee (born October 24, 1981), better known by his stage name Lee Jung or J. Lee, is a South Korean singer and actor. He made his debut as a member of 7 Dayz; Lee has since become a solo singer.  Although his last album has underperformed, he has continued his popularity by becoming a mainstay on KBS's Heroine 6, becoming part of the "Gag Team 3" with Shin Jung Hwan from Country Kko Kko and Kim Jong Min from Koyote.

In January 2007, Lee claimed that another singer used his voice to debut. He stated that he heard his recording being used by another artist by viewing the performance on television. He previously thought the song was going to be his debut song to launch his singing career. "Lee Jung lipsynch singer" went on to become most searched keyword at one point.

He joined the Republic of Korea Marine Corps on October 12, 2008.

Lee released his 10th anniversary album 'Synergy' in November 2013, including title track "We Loved Together", which is composed and written by 5 o'clock and features Ha Dong Kyun. The album also includes "Doesn't Make Sense" which was written by Lee Jand composed by both Lee and Jo Jung-chi as well as his previous digital single, "I Am Sorry" which received attention for being the work of Brave Brothers, "Did You Ever Love" and "Let's Stay Together".

In July 2015, Lee made an appearance under the pseudonym of 'Tungki' on MBC's King of Mask Singer.  Tungki came out guns blazing, eliciting a standing ovation from the judges and cheers all around, with a powerful performance of Kim Kyung Ho's “People Who Make Me Sad.” With that performance he successfully toppled 'Cleopatra' AKA Kim Yeon Woo who until then had enjoyed a record 10-week long rein as the King of Mask and solidified his reputation as one of Korea's most skilled vocalists.

Personal life 
In November 2021, Lee announced on Radio Star television that he had registered his marriage. with his non-celebrity girlfriend and the wedding will take place in May 2022.

Discography

7DAYZ
 7 Dayz (2002)

Solo career
 Vol. 1 – Lee Jung (2003)
 Vol. 2 – Look at Me (2004)
 Vol. 3 – Rebirth of Regent (2006)
 Vol. 4 – Fourth Force (2008)
 Let's Dance (2011) (under the name J. Lee by Medialine and Best Music)
 Let's Dance -EP (2011)
 Lee Jung 10th Anniversary Part.2: Synergy -EP (2013)

As Featured Artist
7DAYZ & Wanted (2007) (Whole album)
명가수의 순정 Leaving Seoul (2017) (collaboration album with Netherlands tulip farm)

Television and movie appearances 
 Nonstop 5 (2004–2005)
 X-Man (2004)
 Love Letter (2006)
 The Legend of Seven Cutter (2006)
 Unstoppable Marriage (2007)
 Welcome to the Show (2011)
 Vampire Idol (2012)
 Immortal Songs 2 (2011–present)
 King of Mask Singer (2015)
 Where Is My Friend's Home (2015)

Awards

References 

1981 births
K-pop singers
Living people
South Korean male actors
South Korean male television actors
South Korean pop singers
Republic of Korea Marine Corps personnel
21st-century South Korean male singers